Geissorhiza radians  is a Geissorhiza species found growing in Northern Cape, South Africa.

References

External links
 
 
 

radians
Endemic flora of South Africa